The Chancellor of the High Court is the head of the Chancery Division of the High Court of Justice of England and Wales.  This judge and the other two heads of divisions (Family and Queens Bench) sit by virtue of their offices often, as and when their expertise is deemed relevant, in panel in the Court of Appeal.  As such this judge ranks equally to the President of the Family Division and the President of the Queen's Bench Division.

From 1813 to 1841, the solitary and from 1841 to 1875, the three ordinary judges of the Court of Chancery — rarely a court of first instance until 1855 – were called vice-chancellors. The more senior judges of the same court were the Lord Chancellor and the Master of the Rolls (who were moved fully to the Court of Appeal above in 1881). Each would occasionally hear cases alone or make declarations on paper applications alone. Partly due to the old system of many pre-pleadings, pleadings and hearings before most cases would reach Chancery the expense and duration of proceedings was pilloried in art and literature before the reforms of the late 19th century. Charles Dickens set Bleak House around raised hopes in (Jarndyce and Jarndyce) a near-incomprehensible, decades-long case in Chancery, involving a decision on an increasingly old will which was rendered useless as all of the deceased's wealth was – unknowingly to the prospective beneficiaries – absorbed in legal costs. Reform swiftly followed.

Certain 1870s to 1899 Acts (the Judicature Acts) merged the courts of law and those of equity and enacted a halt to the position of vice-chancellor – which lasted from 1875 until 1971.

From 1971 until October 2005, the revived high judicial office was called the Vice-Chancellorship (and the judge bore the title Vice-Chancellor). The holder nominally acted as the Lord Chancellor's deputy in the English legal system and as head of the Chancery Division. The key duties of this judge have not changed in substance since 1971.

Ireland
An equivalent position existed in Ireland between 1867 and 1904 (Vice-Chancellor of Ireland) when the office was abolished. Throughout that period it was held by Hedges Eyre Chatterton (who was born in Cork and died in 1910 aged 91).

Vice-chancellors, 1813–1875
Because of an increase in caseload in the Court of Chancery for its two judges (the Lord Chancellor and the Master of the Rolls), an additional judicial office, The Vice-Chancellor of England, was created by the Administration of Justice Act 1813 to share the work. With the transfer of the equity jurisdiction to the Court of Chancery from the Court of Exchequer, two vice-chancellors were added in 1841 by the Chancery Act 1841, with the caveat that no successor for the second of the two new judges (James Wigram) could be appointed. Soon Lancelot Shadwell (the Vice-Chancellor of England at the time the bill came into effect) left office and the three vice-chancellors became of equal status, with the "of England" dropped. In 1851, Parliament relented so a successor to Wigram could be named to keep the number at three (George Turner), but again with the caveat (that proved temporary) that no future successor could be appointed. The caveat was lifted by an Act of 1852 so the number became fixed at three until the next major court reforms.

After the Judicature Acts, which merged the Court of Chancery and various other courts into the new High Court of Justice, came into force, new vice-chancellors were not appointed: new judges of the Chancery Division became styled "Mr. Justice ..." like other High Court judges (adopting the style of the pre-merger common law courts).

 10 April 1813: Sir Thomas Plumer
 17 January 1818: Sir John Leach
 2 May 1827: Sir Anthony Hart
 31 October 1827: Sir Lancelot Shadwell
 28 October 1841 – 1851: Sir James Lewis Knight-Bruce
 28 October 1841 – 1850: Sir James Wigram
 2 November 1850 – 1851: Sir Robert Monsey Rolfe (The Lord Cranworth from 12 December 1850)
 2 April 1851 – 1853: Sir George Turner
 20 October 1851 – 1866: Sir Richard Torin Kindersley
 20 October 1851 – 1852: Sir James Parker
 20 September 1852 – 1871: Sir John Stuart
 10 January 1853 – 1868: Sir William Wood
 1 December 1866 – 1881: Sir Richard Malins
 13 March 1868 – 1869: Sir George Markham Giffard
 2 January 1869 – 1870: Sir William Milbourne James
 4 July 1870 – 1886: Sir James Bacon
 18 April 1871 – 1873: Sir John Wickens
 11 November 1873 – 1882: Sir Charles Hall

Vice-chancellors, 1971–2005
A new judicial post of Vice-Chancellor (its last holder having been that of 1882) was created by section 5 of the Administration of Justice Act 1970, which came into effect on 1 October 1971. Under its provisions the Vice-Chancellor was appointed by the Lord Chancellor (president of the Chancery Division). He became responsible to the latter for administering the division. The Senior Courts Act 1981 made the position one appointed by the Queen (like the President of the Family Division) and made the Vice-Chancellor vice-president of the Chancery Division.
1971: Sir John Pennycuick
1974: Sir Anthony Plowman
1976: Sir Robert Megarry
3 June 1985: Sir Nicolas Browne-Wilkinson
1 October 1991: Sir Donald Nicholls
3 October 1994: Sir Richard Scott
17 July 2000: Sir Andrew Morritt (Chancellor of the High Court after the relevant provisions of the Constitutional Reform Act 2005 came into effect on 1 October 2005.)

Chancellor of the High Court, 2005–present
The Constitutional Reform Act 2005 removed the Lord Chancellor's role as a judge. As one of the judicial roles of the office was president of the Chancery Division, the office of Vice-Chancellor was renamed Chancellor of the High Court and replaced the Lord Chancellor. The name change took effect on 1 October 2005, but some of the responsibilities (including the presidency of the division) did not transfer until 3 April 2006. The Constitutional Reform Act retained the position of Vice-Chancellor as vice-president of the Chancery Division, though it does not appear anyone has been appointed to the position or who would make or be eligible for such an appointment.
1 October 2005: Sir Andrew Morritt (Vice-Chancellor before the relevant provisions of the Constitutional Reform Act 2005 came into effect on 1 October 2005.)
11 January 2013: Sir Terence Etherton
24 October 2016: Sir Geoffrey Vos
3 February 2021:  Sir Julian Flaux

See also
 Lord Chief Justice of England and Wales
 Master of the Rolls
 President of the Queen's Bench Division
 President of the Family Division

References

 A History of English Law, Vol. I, by Sir William Holdsworth (Methuen & Co, 1961 reprint)
 Twentieth-Century British Political Facts 1900–2000, by David Butler and Gareth Butler (Macmillan Press 2000)
 Joseph Haydn, The Book of Dignities, 1894

External links
New legal year sees new team take up posts Department for Constitutional Affairs press release, 3 October 2005)
Lists of Judges from the Department for Constitutional Affairs

High Court
High Court of Justice
English civil law